Elachista trapeziella is a moth of the family Elachistidae found in Europe.

The head is grey, face white.Forewings are blackish ; a spot on fold towards base, one on middle of costa and another beneath it on fold, in female larger and sometimes confluent, a fourth on tornus, and a fifth at apex shining white. Hindwings are dark fuscous. The larva is greenish-grey, faintly reddish tinged. 

Adults are on wing from June to August.

The larvae feed on white wood-rush (Luzula luzuloides), hairy wood-rush (Luzula pilosa) and greater wood-rush (Luzula sylvatica). They mine the leaves of their host plant. At first, the larvae creates a narrow corridor which runs parallel to the leaf venation, although it may change direction two to three times. Later, this gallery abruptly changes into an elongate blotch, generally destroying the original gallery. Larvae may vacate the mine and restart elsewhere. Pupation takes place outside of the mine. They are pink with three cream-coloured length lines and a black head. Larvae can be found from autumn to April or June of the following year.

Distribution
It is found from Fennoscandia to the Pyrenees and Italy and from Ireland to Slovakia.

References

External links
 Video of a mining Elachista trapeziella larva 
 Elachista trapeziella at UKmoths

trapeziella
Leaf miners
Moths described in 1849
Moths of Europe
Taxa named by Henry Tibbats Stainton